Cuttack railway station is a railway junction and serves Cuttack  in the Indian state of Odisha.

History
During the period 1893 to 1896,   of East Coast State Railway was built and opened to traffic. It necessitated construction of some of the largest bridges across rivers like Brahmani, Kathajodi, Kuakhai, Mahanadi (Longest river of odisha) and Birupa. Cuttack station was connected to the Indian railway network in 1899.

Railway Organisation
The Cuttack station is operating under Khurda road Division of East Coast Railway.

Cuttack railway station is amongst the top hundred booking stations of Indian Railway.

References

External links
 

Transport in Cuttack
Railway stations in Cuttack district
Khurda Road railway division
Railway stations in India opened in 1899
Railway junction stations in Odisha